The canton of Vienne-2 is an administrative division of the Isère department, eastern France. It was created at the French canton reorganisation which came into effect in March 2015. Its seat is in Vienne.

It consists of the following communes:
 
Assieu
Auberives-sur-Varèze
Cheyssieu
Chonas-l'Amballan
Clonas-sur-Varèze
Les Côtes-d'Arey
Estrablin
Eyzin-Pinet
Jardin
Reventin-Vaugris
Les Roches-de-Condrieu
Saint-Alban-du-Rhône
Saint-Clair-du-Rhône
Saint-Maurice-l'Exil
Saint-Prim
Saint-Sorlin-de-Vienne
Vernioz
Vienne (partly)

References

Cantons of Isère